Tekovský Hrádok is a village and municipality in the Levice District in the Nitra Region of Slovakia.

History
In historical records the village was first mentioned in 1232.

Geography
The village lies at an altitude of 156 metres and covers an area of 7.316 km2. It has a population of about 330 people.

Ethnicity
The village is about 57% Magyar and 43% Slovak.

Facilities
The village has a public library.

References

External links
http://www.statistics.sk/mosmis/eng/run.html

Villages and municipalities in Levice District